Anthonomopsis is a genus of true weevils in the beetle family Curculionidae. There is at least one described species in Anthonomopsis, A. mixta.

References

Further reading

 
 
 
 

Curculioninae
Articles created by Qbugbot